Shaun Micallef's World Around Him was an Australian sketch comedy television special. Its title is a parody of the Australian documentary series The World Around Us. Airing on the Seven Network in 1996, the special provided a major stepping stone for comedian Shaun Micallef. The show helped to develop much of the style and content of Micallef's successful sketch-comedy series The Micallef Program which began airing on the ABC in 1998.

DVD
The show was released as a bonus extra on the 2011 DVD The Incompleat Shaun Micallef which featured highlights of Micallef's work on the comedy series Full Frontal 1995-1997.

External links 
 

Australian television sketch shows
1996 Australian television series debuts
1996 Australian television series endings